Çukurkuyu is a belde (town) in Bor district of Niğde Province, Turkey. At  it is situated in the plains of Central Anatolia, to the south of Melendiz Mountain. The population of Çukurkuyu is 2279 as of 2011. The village was founded by semi nomadic Turkmen tribes . In 1956 it was declared a seat of township. Agriculture is the main economic activity. Carpet weaving is secondary activity. Some town residents also work in Sugar refinery in Bor.

Notable natives
Ömer Halisdemir (1974–2016), non-commissioned officer, who was killed on duty in the night of 2016 Turkish coup d'état attempt, right after he shot dead a pro-coup general and prevented so the coupists capture the headquarters of the Special Forces Command in Ankara. He is remembered as a major contributor to the failure of the coup attempt.

References 

Towns in Turkey
Populated places in Niğde Province
Bor District, Niğde